Effat Nagy  (. Nagi, Effat Naghi, or Effat Nagui) (5 April 1905 – 4 October 1994) was an Egyptian artist who has a museum in Cairo devoted to her and her husband's works. The museum is called Museum of Saad El-Khadem and Effat Nagy.

Life
Effat Mousa Nagy was born in the Mediterranean port of Alexandria in 1905. She was fascinated by culture and she was trained in music and mathematics. She was taught art by a private tutor and her artistic brother Mohamed Nagy. Her formal training was at the Arts Academy in Rome in 1947. She worked in Egypt under André Lhote and they used Egyptian archaeology as subject matter.

She married Saad Al-Khadem in 1945. He was also an artist but also a researcher. Her husband's research inspired her art.

In 1956 she received a compliment from her brother. He said that her work exceeded his as he felt that his work was too restrained by his academic training.

In 1964 she exhibited her work at the High Dam (as-Sad al-'Aali) Exhibition. This was a result of work that she had been commissioned to do the previous year. She was asked to record the archaeology that would be lost as it was submerged under the waters of the Aswan Dam as it was constructed. She was one of 64 artists chosen to do this work.

In 1968 the Mohamed Nagy Museum was founded and Nagy made a donation of forty of her brother's paintings to help create a collection of her brother's work.

Nagy died in 1994 although another source says 1997.

Selected solo exhibitions
 At Alexandria Atelier 1948
 At association of Fine arts lovers, Cairo 1956
 At the Museum of Fine arts, Alexandria 1957
 in Florenca and Rome 1962
 At Golden circle gallery, Switzerlands 1971
 At the French Cultural Center, Alexandria, accompanied by Symposium about Andriea Lout 1976
 At Mashrabia gallery, Cairo 1987
 At A-Qandeel gallery entitle` 50 years of Effat Nagy` 1992
 At Atelier 1999

Legacy
Nagy and her husband have a museum in Cairo which contains about 200 of their paintings and pottery. The Museum of Saad El-Khadem and Effat Nagy holds 24 paintings by Nagy and 34 by her husband including a large nude where Nagy is the model. The building also contains their old library which holds many useful books on folklore and astrology. Nagy left her house to the Egyptian government, but it was the French government who paid for her biography to be published.

References

1905 births
1990s deaths
People from Alexandria
Egyptian women artists
20th-century Egyptian painters
20th-century Egyptian women artists